Harutaeographa bidui is a moth of the family Noctuidae. It is found in Pakistan.

Subspecies
Harutaeographa bidui bidui (northern Pakistan)
Harutaeographa bidui kaghanensis Hreblay & Ronkay, 1999 (Pakistan: Kaghan valley)

References

Moths described in 1996
Orthosiini